Cause for Conflict is the seventh studio album by German thrash metal band Kreator released on 1 August, 1995. 

The record continued the experimentation with industrial music that they started on previous album, Renewal, but brought back more of their thrash metal sound. This was also the only Kreator album to feature Joe Cangelosi as the replacement of original drummer Jürgen "Ventor" Reil, who would return to the band in 1996, as well as the first to feature bassist Christian Giesler and the last to feature guitarist Frank "Blackfire" Gosdzik.

Release
In March 2018, German heavy metal record label Noise released a remastered edition of the album and made it available on CD and vinyl and as digital download. The release contains three bonus tracks and liner notes.

Track listing

Personnel

Kreator
 Mille Petrozza – vocals, rhythm guitar
 Frank "Blackfire" Gosdzik – lead guitar
 Christian Giesler – bass
 Joe Cangelosi – drums

Production
 Vincent Wojno – producer with Kreator, engineer, mixing
 Doug Trantow – assistant engineer
 Mark Uehlein, Steve Warner – studio assistants
 Dirk Rudolph – sleeve design, photography, band photography
 Junior – illustrations

2018 reissue technical personnel
 Steve Hammond – compilation
 Andy Pearce, Matt Worthams – mastering
 Thomas Ewerhard, Jan Meininghaus – art and design
 Alex Solca, Barbara Stiller – additional photos
 Malcolm Dome – sleeve notes

Charts

References

Kreator albums
1995 albums
GUN Records albums
Industrial metal albums
Noise Records albums